Andrew Wilkinson may refer to:

Andrew Wilkinson, Australian-born Canadian politician
Andrew Wilkinson (British politician), British politician
Andrew Wilkinson (paediatrician), British paediatrician
Andrew Wood Wilkinson, British paediatric surgeon